Richard Breakey (born 14 November 1956) is a former Scotland international rugby union player. He played for Scotland in the 1978 Five Nations tournament.

Personal

Breakey was educated at Fettes College and Durham University (Hatfield College). His older brother Nigel (1955–2010) was an anaesthetist who played rugby for Scotland Schoolboys and Cambridge University.

Rugby union career

Amateur career

He played for Gosforth.

Provincial career

He played for the Anglo-Scots district side.

International career

He was capped twice by Scotland 'B', from 1976 to 1978.

Breakey made his first full senior cap and only test appearance for Scotland as a Fly-half in the 1978 Five Nations match against England, held at Murrayfield, which would result in a 0–15 defeat for the Scots. He replaced the injured Ian McGeechan.

Breakey was later an unused replacement for Scotland in the final match of the 1981 Five Nations Championship against Ireland.

References

External links
 

1956 births
Living people
Alumni of Hatfield College, Durham
Durham University RFC players
English rugby union players
Newcastle Falcons players
People educated at Fettes College
Rugby union players from Consett
Scotland 'B' international rugby union players
Scotland international rugby union players
Scottish Exiles (rugby union) players
Scottish rugby union players
Rugby union fly-halves